Ouachita County is a county located in the south central part of the U.S. state of Arkansas. As of the 2020 census, the population was 22,650.

The county seat is Camden. Ouachita County is part of the Camden, AR Micropolitan Statistical Area. Formed on November 29, 1842, the county is named for the Ouachita River.

History
Until the late 20th century, the county was a Democratic Party stronghold, aided by the state's having disenfranchised most African Americans at the turn of the century. As in much of the rest of the South, conservative whites, who constitute the majority of the population in the county, have shifted into the Republican Party. In 1972, U.S. President Richard M. Nixon became the first Republican presidential nominee in the 20th century to win a majority in Ouachita County. Much later, in the 2008 presidential election, U.S. Senator John McCain won the county by nearly ten percentage votes over Senator Barack Obama, following  President George W. Bush's victory over Senator John F. Kerry in 2004.

The politically influential Pryor family is based here; they include two U.S. senators, David Pryor (serving 1978–1997) and his son Mark Pryor (elected 2002). The elder Pryor also served as a former governor of Arkansas and US Congressman.  The county is served by a daily newspaper, The Camden News.

Geography

Major highways
 Future Interstate 69
 U.S. Highway 79
 U.S. Highway 278
 Highway 4
 Highway 7
 Highway 9
 Highway 24

Adjacent counties
Dallas County (north)
Calhoun County (east)
Union County (south)
Columbia County (southwest)
Nevada County (west)
Clark County (northwest)

Demographics
The county had its peak of population in 1950.

2020 census

As of the 2020 United States census, there were 22,650 people, 9,658 households, and 6,009 families residing in the county.

2010 census
As of the 2010 census, there were 26,120 people living in the county. The racial makeup of the county was 56.3% White, 39.9% Black, 0.3% Native American, 0.4% Asian, <0.1% Pacific Islander, 0.1% from some other race and 1.4% from two or more races. 1.6% were Hispanic or Latino of any race.

2000 census
As of the 2000 census, there were 28,790 people, 11,613 households, and 8,071 families living in the county. There were 13,450 housing units at an average density of 18 per square mile (7/km2). The racial makeup of the county was 59.74% White, 38.64% Black or African American, 0.25% Native American, 0.24% Asian, 0.03% Pacific Islander, 0.26% from other races, and 0.83% from two or more races. 0.73% of the population were Hispanic or Latino of any race.

There were 11,613 households, out of which 30.80% had children under the age of 18 living with them, 50.00% were married couples living together, 15.60% had a female householder with no husband present, and 30.50% were non-families. 28.00% of all households were made up of individuals, and 13.50% had someone living alone who was 65 years of age or older. The average household size was 2.45 and the average family size was 2.99.

In the county, the population was spread out, with 25.90% under the age of 18, 8.00% from 18 to 24, 25.60% from 25 to 44, 23.60% from 45 to 64, and 16.90% who were 65 years of age or older. The median age was 39 years. For every 100 females, there were 89.80 males. For every 100 females age 18 and over, there were 85.00 males.

The median income for a household in the county was $29,341, and the median income for a family was $35,736. Males had a median income of $30,976 versus $18,800 for females. The per capita income for the county was $15,118. About 16.10% of families and 19.50% of the population were below the poverty line, including 26.20% of those under age 18 and 18.60% of those age 65 or over.

Government
Over the past few election cycles Ouachita County has trended towards the GOP. The last democrat (as of 2020) to carry this county was Al Gore in 2000.

In 2020, the county saw an increase in third party votes compared to 2016, whereas the national trend was a significant drop of third party support.

Communities

Cities
Bearden
Camden (county seat)
Chidester
East Camden
Stephens

Town
Louann

Census designated place
Reader

Unincorporated community
Cullendale

Townships

 Behestian
 Bradley (East Camden)
 Bragg
 Bridge Creek (Elliott)
 Carroll
 Cleveland
 Ecore Fabre (most of Camden)
 Freeo
 Jefferson
 Lafayette (small part of Camden)
 Liberty
 Marion (Buena Vista)
 Red Hill (Chidester, most of CDP Reader)
 River
 Smackover (Stephens)
 Union (Bearden)
 Valley
 Washington (Louann)

Monuments and memorials

See also
 List of lakes in Ouachita County, Arkansas
 National Register of Historic Places listings in Ouachita County, Arkansas
 USS Ouachita County (LST-1071)

References

External links
 Ouachita County, Arkansas entry on the Encyclopedia of Arkansas History & Culture
Ouachita County Sheriff's Office

 
1842 establishments in Arkansas
Populated places established in 1842
Arkansas placenames of Native American origin
Camden, Arkansas micropolitan area